The Anna B. Pratt Elementary School (commonly referred to as the Anna B. Pratt Academy) was a district-run elementary school in Philadelphia. 

The school was closed in 2013 as part of Philadelphia's shutdown of 23 district-run schools. Displaced students were enrolled in the Richard R. Wright School and the William Dick School.

See also
 List of schools of the School District of Philadelphia

Notes

Pratt, Anna B. Elementary School
School District of Philadelphia
Public elementary schools in Pennsylvania
2013 disestablishments in Pennsylvania